Groovin' with Jacquet (aka Groovin') is an album by American jazz saxophonist Illinois Jacquet, recorded in 1951 and late 1953 and released on the Clef label.

Reception

AllMusic awarded the album 3 stars.

Track listing
All compositions by Illinois Jacquet except as indicated
 "Just A-Sittin' and A-Rockin'" (Duke Ellington, Billy Strayhorn, Lee Gaines) - 2:50
 "Mean to Me" (Fred E. Ahlert, Roy Turk) - 3:16
 "One Nighter Boogie" - 3:00
 "Wrap Your Troubles in Dreams" (Harry Barrisl, Ted Koehler, Billy Moll) - 3:25
 "Cotton Tail" (Ellington) - 2:52
 "Weary Blues" - 3:12
 "Groovin'" - 2:40
 "Little Jeff" (Jacquet, Acea) - 2:41
 "Jacquet Jumps" (Jacquet, Acea) - 1:49
 "Blue Nocturne" " (Jacquet, Acea, Elwyn Frazier) - 3:07
 "On Your Toes" (Jacquet, A. K. Salim) - 3:16
 "R.U. One" (Jacquet, Salim) - 2:53
Recorded in New York City on May 24, 1951 (tracks 1-7) and December 11, 1953 (tracks 8-12)

Personnel 
Illinois Jacquet - tenor saxophone
Russell Jacquet - trumpet (tracks 8-12)
Matthew Gee - trombone (tracks 8-12)
Cecil Payne - baritone saxophone (tracks 8-12)
Johnny Acea (tracks 8-12), Hank Jones (tracks 1-7) - piano
John Collins - guitar (tracks 1-7) 
Al Lucas (tracks 8-12), Gene Ramey (tracks 1-7) - bass
Shadow Wilson (tracks 8-12), Art Blakey (tracks 1-7) - drums

References 

1956 albums
Illinois Jacquet albums
Clef Records albums
Albums produced by Norman Granz